Chlorolestes apricans
Chlorolestes assegaii
Chlorolestes conspicuus
Chlorolestes draconicus
Chlorolestes elegans
Chlorolestes fasciatus
Chlorolestes tessellatus
Chlorolestes umbratus
 Chorismagrion risi
Ecchlorolestes nylephtha
Ecchlorolestes peringueyi
Episynlestes albicaudus
Episynlestes cristatus
Episynlestes intermedius
Megalestes chengi
Megalestes distans
Megalestes haui
Megalestes heros
Megalestes irma
Megalestes kurahashii
Megalestes lieftincki
Megalestes maai
Megalestes major
Megalestes micans
Megalestes raychoudhurii
Megalestes riccii
Megalestes suensoni
Megalestes tuska
Phylolestes ethelae 
Sinolestes edita
Sinolestes ornatus
Synlestes selysi
Synlestes tropicus
Synlestes weyersii

References